Puerto Rico Highway 114 (PR-114) is a rural road that travels from Mayagüez to San Germán. PR-114 begins at the intersection of PR-2 and Avenida los Corazones in Mayagüez and ends at the intersection with PR-102 at the entrance to the center of San Germán. This road passes through the municipalities of Hormigueros and Cabo Rojo before coming to San Germán.

It is a fairly straight road, but is often flooded during periods of heavy rain due to poor drainage and its location near the Guanajibo River.

Major intersections

See also

 List of highways numbered 114

References

External links
 

114